Monoicomyces is a genus of fungi in the family Laboulbeniaceae. The genus contain 48 species.

References

External links
Monoicomyces at Index Fungorum

Laboulbeniomycetes